was a Japanese smoothbore, muzzle loaded weapon used during the Second World War. It first entered service in 1921. The Type 10 has a range of 175 meters, greater than other grenade dischargers of that time. It had a range control device at the base of the barrel in the form of a graduated thimble by which a gas port at the base of the tube could be varied in size. For shorter ranges, part of the propellant gases escape to the side. Due to a translation error, the Type 10 was called the "knee mortar" by the Americans. The manual for the mortar instructed the troops to carry the mortar on the upper thigh, with the base plate attached to the belt and the barrel running down the thigh. It must be understood that it was not strapped or secured directly to the thigh, but hung from the belt. It was also carried strapped to the backpack. American troops on Guadalcanal became aware of the name "knee mortar" and thought the light design allowed it to be fired with the base plate resting on the thigh. If the Type 10 were fired in this manner, it would result in serious injury due to recoil.  However, once a few troops injured themselves, the mistranslation was discovered and further experimentation discouraged.

Contemporary US intelligence thought that the weapon was primarily used to discharge flares, the heavier Type 89 grenade discharger being used to fire explosive rounds instead.

Ammunition
 Type 91 grenade
 Type 11 smoke shell
 Type 10 flare shell
 Type 10 signal shell
 Type 91 pyrotechnic grenade
 Type 10 blank

References
 Taki (Type 10)
 http://www.ibiblio.org/hyperwar/Japan/IJA/HB/HB-9.html
 Leo J. Daugherty III, Fighting Techniques of a Japanese Infantryman 1941-1945,

See also

Grenade launcher

10
10
Grenade launchers of Manchukuo
Military equipment introduced in the 1920s